Rock Castle is an historical estate located at Rock Castle, Goochland County, Virginia.  Located on the Rock Castle property is the Queen Anne Cottage.  It is a small, five-bay, -story frame structure with clipped gable ends and two interior end chimneys.  The house was built prior to 1732. In 1843 Rock Castle was purchased by John Rutherfoord, Governor of Virginia from 1841 to 1842.

It was listed on the National Register of Historic Places in 1970.

References

Houses on the National Register of Historic Places in Virginia
Houses in Goochland County, Virginia
National Register of Historic Places in Goochland County, Virginia